Margaret of Hanau (1452 – 14 March 1467) was the only daughter of Count  Reinhard III of Hanau (1412-1452) and his wife Countess Palatine Margaret of Mosbach (1432-1457).

Engagement 
On 14 August 1459, at the age of seven, Margaret was engaged to Philip of Eppstein-Königstein. An explanation for this large sum may be that she was her parents' only daughter and, since both of her parents had already died, would not have to pay another dowry. The sum was reduced by 650 guilders, which the Eppstein family were supposed to earn as interest, and was to be paid from the revenues of the city of Butzbach.

However, Margaret died in 1467 and the marriage never happened.

Ancestors

References 
 Reinhard Dietrich: Die Landesverfassung in dem Hanauischen, in the series Hanauer Geschichtsblätter, vol. 34, Hanau, 1996, 
 Reinhard Suchier: Genealogie des Hanauer GrafenhausesV, in: Festschrift des Hanauer Geschichtsvereins zu seiner fünfzigjährigen Jubelfeier am 27. August 1894, Hanau, 1894
 Ernst J. Zimmermann: Hanau Stadt und Land — Margarethe von Hanau (* 1452, † 14. März 1467) war die Tochter des Grafen Graf Reinhard III von Hanau (1412–1452) und der Pfalzgräfin Margarethe von Pfalz-Mosbach (1432–1457), 3rd ed., Hanau, 1919, reprinted 1978

Footnotes 

1452 births
1467 deaths
House of Hanau
15th-century German people
15th-century German women